The men's points race competition at the 2018 UEC European Track Championships was held on 5 August 2018.

Results
160 laps (40 km) were raced with 16 sprints.

References

Men's points race
European Track Championships – Men's points race